Louise Jordan was a geologist.

Louise Jordan may also refer to:

Louise Jordan (novelist)

See also
Louise Jordan Smith, American painter and academic
Louisa Jordan (disambiguation)